Sar Chah-e Tazian (also Romanized as Sar Chāh-e Tāzīān; also known as Sar-i-Chāh and Sar Chāh) is a village in Kahshang Rural District, in the Central District of Birjand County, South Khorasan Province, Iran. At the 2016 census, its population was 461, in 135 families.

References 

Populated places in Birjand County